Libera me is a 1993 French experimental film directed by Alain Cavalier. It was entered into the 1993 Cannes Film Festival.

Cast
 Louis Becker
 Catherine Caron
 Paul Chevillard
 Annick Concha as Mother
 Pierre Concha as Father
 François Cristophe
 Cécile Haas as Helper's girlfriend
 Michel Labelle as Butcher
 Thierry Labelle as Older son
 Jean Monot
 Michel Quenneville as Photographer
 Claire Séguin as Blonde woman
 Philippe Tardif as Helper
 Christophe Turrier as Younger son

References

External links

1993 films
1990s avant-garde and experimental films
Films without speech
French avant-garde and experimental films
Films directed by Alain Cavalier
1990s French films